The women's shot put at the 1966 European Athletics Championships was held in Budapest, Hungary, at Népstadion on 30 August 1966.

Medalists

Results

Final
30 August

Participation
According to an unofficial count, 14 athletes from 9 countries participated in the event.

 (1)
 (2)
 (1)
 (2)
 (2)
 (1)
 (2)
 (1)
 (2)

References

Shot put
Shot put at the European Athletics Championships
Euro